January Kristen Jones (born January 5, 1978) is an American actress and model. She played Betty Draper in Mad Men (2007–2015), for which she was nominated for two Golden Globe Awards for Best Actress – Television Series Drama and a Primetime Emmy Award for Outstanding Lead Actress in a Drama Series. She also portrayed Melissa Chartres in The Last Man on Earth (2015–2018) and has starred in films such as American Wedding (2003), We Are Marshall (2006), The Boat That Rocked (2009), Unknown (2011), Seeking Justice (2011), and X-Men: First Class (2011).

Early life
January Kristen Jones was born in Sioux Falls, South Dakota, on January 5, 1978, the daughter of store manager Karen Cox and exercise physiologist Marvin Jones. She was named after January Wayne, a character in the 1973 Jacqueline Susann novel Once Is Not Enough. The names of her two sisters also start with the letter J, Jina and Jacey. In 1979, her family moved to Hecla, South Dakota, but moved back to Sioux Falls in 1996, where she graduated from Roosevelt High School.

Career

Acting
Jones appears in the video "Love is Blind" from the album Into the Light (2000) by David Coverdale and had supporting roles in Anger Management (2003), Love Actually (2003), and Dirty Dancing: Havana Nights (2004). In 2005, she appeared as a U.S. border guard's wife in the film The Three Burials of Melquiades Estrada, directed by and starring Tommy Lee Jones. She has remarked that working on this film was one of the most creative experiences of her entire working life. In We Are Marshall (2006), she played the role of Carol Dawson, wife of American football coach William "Red" Dawson. Jones also starred in Good Kill (2014), opposite Ethan Hawke.

She played the lead female role in the movie Love's Enduring Promise as a pioneer family's oldest child. Her character falls in love with a mysterious man who saves her father's life. She also appeared in the AMC original television drama series Mad Men for seven seasons as young suburban housewife and mother Betty Draper Francis. She received two Golden Globe nominations and one Emmy nomination for her performances.

Jones is also known for her role as Cadence Flaherty, the love interest of both Steve Stifler and Paul Finch in the 2003 comedy film American Wedding, the third installment of the American Pie film series. She played a con artist in the Law & Order episode "Quit Claim" who, as a lone surviving suspect connected to a real estate scam involving organized crime, frustrates the efforts of Assistant District Attorney Michael Cutter. She also appeared in The Boat That Rocked, a British film about offshore pirate radio in the 1960s, renamed Pirate Radio for North American release in 2009.

Jones was ranked No. 82 on the Maxim Hot 100 Women of 2002. She appeared on the cover of "The Hot Issue" of British GQ magazine in May 2009. She appeared on the cover of the November 2009 issue of American GQ magazine, and has been a 'topic' in the magazine several times. On November 14, 2009, Jones hosted an episode of Saturday Night Live, which featured the musical guest The Black Eyed Peas.

In 2011, Jones starred in two thriller films, first in Unknown alongside Liam Neeson and Diane Kruger, directed by Jaume Collet-Serra, and later in Seeking Justice alongside Nicolas Cage and Guy Pearce. She portrayed Emma Frost in X-Men: First Class.

Jones appeared as Melissa Chartres in the Fox television comedy series The Last Man on Earth (2015–18). In 2019, she joined the cast of Netflix's comedy-drama series The Politician, playing the role of a bored and rich housewife Lizbeth Sloan. In 2020, Jones joined the cast of the Netflix series Spinning Out as Carol Baker, a former figure skater and a single mother who suffers from bipolar disorder. The series concluded after one season.

Modeling
Jones began her modeling career in New York at the age of 18, after a modeling scout expressed interest while she was in high school. She noted that modelling was not her passion and she never took it seriously. Her first agency claimed she owed them money when she decided to move to Los Angeles. Jones has modeled for Abercrombie & Fitch, Versace, Clearasil and Kérastase. She has been on the covers of numerous international fashion magazines, including Interview, Allure, Rolling Stone, Town & Country, The Hollywood Reporter and W in the United States; Harper's Bazaar, Marie Claire, Tatler, Glamour and Red in the United Kingdom; Cosmopolitan in Germany; Grazia in Italy; and Tu Style and GQ in Italy.

Charity work
In 2009, Jones joined the marine conservation organization Oceana as a celebrity spokesperson, working to save endangered sharks and to inform others about sharks' vital importance in nature. She has gone swimming with sharks for a public service announcement for the group. She served food with fellow actress Malin Åkerman at the Los Angeles Mission's annual Thanksgiving event on November 24, 2021.

Personal life
Jones dated Ashton Kutcher when they were both models for Abercrombie & Fitch in the late 1990s. She was in a relationship with singer Josh Groban from 2003 to 2006.

In September 2011, she gave birth to a son named Xander, whose father's identity was not publicly disclosed.

One of Jones's favorite actors is Robert Stack. During her relationship with Jim Carrey in 2002, he presented her with Stack's autograph as a birthday present.

Jones has an interest in unsolved mysteries and believes she has seen a UFO. She has a tattoo that says "Bellatrix", the Latin word for female warrior.

Filmography

Film

Television

References

External links

 

1978 births
20th-century American actresses
21st-century American actresses
Actresses from South Dakota
American film actresses
American people of Czech descent
American people of Danish descent
American people of English descent
American people of German descent
American people of Welsh descent
American television actresses
Female models from South Dakota
Living people
People from Sioux Falls, South Dakota
People from Brown County, South Dakota